Sir William Turner  (7 January 1832, in Lancaster – 15 February 1916, in Edinburgh) was an English anatomist and was the Principal of the University of Edinburgh from 1903 to 1916.

Life

Turner was born in Lancaster the son of William Turner a relatively rich cabinetmaker, and his wife, Margaret Aldren. He was educated at various private schools, and then apprenticed to a local physician, Dr Christopher Johnston.

He afterwards studied medicine at St. Bartholomew's hospital, and graduated M.B. from the University of London in 1857. In 1854 he became senior demonstrator in anatomy at the University of Edinburgh. He lived in rooms at Old College.

In 1861 he was elected a Fellow of the Royal Society of Edinburgh, his proposer being John Goodsir. He served as the society's secretary from 1869 to 1891, twice as vice president from 1891 to 1895 and from 1897 to 1903, and as president from 1908 to 1913. He won the society's Neill Prize for 1868 to 1871 and the Keith Prize for 1901-1903. He came to fame in 1857 with the publication of the nationally acclaimed "Atlas of Human Anatomy and Physiology", a remarkable work for someone of only 25. The book has had multiple issues and remains in print in the 21st century.

Turner was appointed Professor of Anatomy at the University of Edinburgh in 1867. Only at this point (despite being married) did he leave his rooms at Old College and move to a house. This was at 7 Brunswick Street north of Calton Hill. His assistant at this point was Morrison Watson who acted as his demonstrator.

In 1868 he was elected a member of the Aesculapian Club. He was elected a Fellow of the Royal Society in 1877. His candidature citation read:" Member of the General Medical Council. – Formerly Examiner in Anatomy in the University of London, and Lecturer on Anatomy and Physiology at the Royal College of Surgeons of England. Author of a Memoir on the Placentation of the Lemurs in the Philosophical Transactions 1876; and of papers in the Proceedings of the Royal Society June 1854 June 1865 and December 1875 – Author of papers in the Transactions of the Royal Society of Edinburgh in 1860, 1865, 1870, 1871, 1872, 1873, 1875 and of numerous papers in the Proceedings of the Society. One of the founders and conductors of the Journal of Anatomy and Physiology and author of many papers in it. Eminent as an Anatomist and Physiologist." Turner was best known as a brain surgeon, and published various valuable papers on the subject. He wrote An Introduction to Human Anatomy: Including the Anatomy of the Tissues and also developed a set of eight anatomical charts for use in an anatomy laboratory or classroom of a medical school. The charts illustrate bones, ligaments, muscles, heart and arteries, veins and lungs, organs of digestion, nervous system, and organs of sense and voice.

He was President of the Royal College of Surgeons of Edinburgh 1882/3.

Turner held the position of president of the General Medical Council from 1898 to 1904, and in 1900 was president of the British Association. He was elected President of the Anatomical Society of Great Britain and Ireland from 1890 to 1893.

In later life he lived at 6 Eton Terrace overlooking Dean Bridge.

He died at home in Edinburgh 15 February 1916 and is buried nearby, in Dean Cemetery in the north section against the dividing wall to the original cemetery to the south. His wife and two daughters lie with him.

Publications

Atlas of Human Anatomy and Physiology (1857)
Comparative Anatomy of the Placenta (1876)
Anatomy (1879)

Family
In 1863, he married Agnes Logan (1835-1908). They were parents to, amongst others, Arthur Logan Turner FRSE.

Honours and awards
He was knighted in 1886 and made a K.C.B. in 1901. He received an honorary doctorate (LL.D.) from the University of St Andrews in February 1902. In December 1909, the Town Council of Edinburgh awarded him Freedom of the City.

Recognition

Turner House in Pollock Halls of Residence at the University of Edinburgh is named after him.

Artistic Recognition

His sketch portrait of 1884, by William Brassey Hole, is held by the Scottish National Portrait Gallery.

References

Further reading

 – dedicated to Turner
 – written by William Turner's son

1832 births
1916 deaths
People from Lancaster, Lancashire
Academics of the University of Edinburgh
Alumni of the University of Edinburgh
Alumni of the Medical College of St Bartholomew's Hospital
British anatomists
Knights Commander of the Order of the Bath
Recipients of the Pour le Mérite (civil class)
Principals of the University of Edinburgh
Presidents of the Royal Society of Edinburgh
British anthropologists
Presidents of the British Science Association
Fellows of the Royal Society
Presidents of the Royal College of Surgeons of Edinburgh
Burials at the Dean Cemetery
Chairs of the General Medical Council